The 1924 Connecticut gubernatorial election was held on November 4, 1924. Republican nominee Hiram Bingham III defeated Democratic nominee Charles G. Morris with 66.18% of the vote.

General election

Candidates
Major party candidates
Hiram Bingham III, Republican
Charles G. Morris, Democratic

Other candidates
Jasper McLevy, Socialist
Joseph Mackay, Socialist Labor
William Mackenzie, Workers

Results

References

1924
Connecticut
Gubernatorial